Pronichev is a Russian masculine surname, its feminine counterpart is Pronicheva. It may refer to
Dina Pronicheva (1911–1977), Soviet actress
Mikhail Pronichev (born 1968), former Russian football player
Maximilian Pronichev (born 1997), Russian football player
Vladimir Pronichev (born 1953), Russian general

Russian-language surnames